Arrowhead Stadium is an American football stadium in Kansas City, Missouri. It primarily serves as the home venue of the Kansas City Chiefs of the National Football League (NFL). The stadium has been officially named GEHA Field at Arrowhead Stadium (pronounced G.E.H.A.) since March 2021, following a naming rights deal between GEHA and the Chiefs. The agreement began at the start of the 2021 season and ends in January 2031 with the expiration of the leases for the Chiefs and Royals with the stadium's owner, the Jackson County Sports Complex Authority.

It is part of the Truman Sports Complex with adjacent Kauffman Stadium, the home of the Kansas City Royals of Major League Baseball (MLB). Arrowhead Stadium has a seating capacity of 76,416, making it the 27th-largest stadium in the United States and the sixth-largest NFL stadium. It is also the largest sports facility by capacity in the state of Missouri. A $375 million renovation was completed in 2010. The stadium is scheduled to host matches for the 2026 FIFA World Cup and has hosted college football games, as well as other soccer games.

History
When the Dallas Texans of the American Football League (AFL) relocated to Kansas City in 1963 and were rebranded as the Chiefs, they played their home games at Municipal Stadium. They originally shared the stadium with the Kansas City Athletics of Major League Baseball, but the Athletics relocated to Oakland, California, after the 1967 season, with the expansion Kansas City Royals being added in 1969.

Municipal Stadium, built in 1923 and mostly rebuilt in 1955, seated approximately 35,000 for football, but as part of the AFL–NFL merger announced in 1966, NFL stadiums would be required to seat no fewer than 50,000 people. Since the City of Kansas City was unable to find a suitable location for a new stadium, Jackson County stepped in and offered a location on the eastern edge of Kansas City near the interchange of Interstate 70 and Interstate 435.

Voters approved a $102 million bond issue in 1967 to build a new sports complex with two stadiums. The original design called for construction of side-by-side baseball and football stadiums with a common roof that would roll between them. The design proved to be more complicated and expensive than originally thought and so was scrapped in favor of the current open-air configuration. The Chiefs staff, led by team general manager Jack Steadman, helped develop the complex.

Construction
Construction began in 1968. The original two-stadium concept was initially designed by Denver architect Charles Deaton and Steadman. The baseball and football stadiums have a very different appearance, but share utilities, parking, and underground storage. Plans to have covered stadiums were dropped, leaving two open-air stadiums. Lamar Hunt included an owner's suite, complete with three bedrooms, bathrooms, a kitchen, and a living room, to the design of the football stadium. To increase seating while limiting the stadium's footprint, the upper sections were placed at a steep incline which cannot be replicated in modern stadiums due to accessibility regulations.

Deaton's design was implemented by the Kansas City architectural firm of Kivett & Myers. Arrowhead Stadium is considered by some to have had an influence on the design of several future NFL stadiums. Construction of the stadium was a joint venture Sharp-Kidde-Webb construction firms.

1970s

Construction on Arrowhead Stadium was completed in time for the 1972 season. On August 12, 1972, the Chiefs defeated the St. Louis Cardinals 24–14 in the first preseason game at Arrowhead Stadium. On November 5, 1972, 82,094 people (the largest crowd to see a game at Arrowhead Stadium) saw the Chiefs defeat the Oakland Raiders, 27-14, to mark their first regular-season victory in their new home.

In 1973, the stadium was the first in the NFL to include arrows on the yard markers to indicate the nearer goal line. (Initially, they resembled little Indian arrowheads.) This practice would eventually spread to the other NFL stadiums as the 1970s progressed, finally becoming mandatory league-wide in the 1978 season (after being used in Super Bowl XII), and become almost near-universal at lower levels of football.

On January 20, 1974, Arrowhead Stadium hosted the Pro Bowl. Due to an ice storm and brutally cold temperatures the week leading up to the game, the game's participants worked out at the facilities of the San Diego Chargers. The AFC defeated the NFC, 15–13.

1980s–present

In 1984, the Jackson County Sports Authority re-evaluated the concept of a fabric dome. The concept was disregarded as being unnecessary and financially impractical. Arrowhead hosted the Drum Corps International World Championships in 1988 and 1989.

In 1991, two Diamond Vision screens shaped as footballs were installed. In 1994, other improvements were made and natural grass playing surface was installed, replacing the original artificial AstroTurf playing field.

In 2009, Arrowhead Stadium completed the installation of a multimillion-dollar integrated system from Daktronics out of Brookings, South Dakota. Two high definition video displays were retrofitted into the existing football-shaped displays in both end zones. Approximately  of digital ribbon board technology was also installed in the stadium.

In 2013, Arrowhead Stadium started using a new playing surface known as NorthBridge Bermudagrass.  The reason the team made the switch was due to the cold weather tolerance, rapid recovery and aggressive rooting.   

In 2021, the Chiefs sold the naming rights for Arrowhead Stadium to GEHA, renaming it GEHA Field at Arrowhead Stadium.

Arrowhead Stadium will be one of the hosts for the 2026 FIFA World Cup and it is scheduled to undergo small renovations in the years ahead. Seating capacity is expected to be reduced in the corners of the end zones to comply with FIFA field regulations. Space would also have to be made for hospitality and media seating (outside of the stadium's already existing press box). The field will also undergo improvement to its ventilation system.

Noise record

In 1990 in a game against the Denver Broncos, the Chiefs were threatened with a penalty if the crowd would not quiet down. After John Elway was backed up to his own goal line and unable to even run a play he quickly spoke to the referee. After listening to Elway the referee said "Any further crowd-noise problem will result in a charged timeout against Kansas City. Thank you for your cooperation."

On October 13, 2013, in a game between the Chiefs and Oakland Raiders, the crowd at the stadium set a Guinness World Record for the loudest stadium, with 137.5 dB. That record would be broken by Seattle Seahawks fans at CenturyLink Field on December 2, 2013 at a home game against the New Orleans Saints. Seattle gained the record by reaching a noise level of 137.6 decibels. The Chiefs reclaimed the title on September 29, 2014 in a Monday Night Football game against the New England Patriots, hitting 142.2 decibels.

College football 
Arrowhead Stadium has hosted five Big 12 Conference football championship games: Kansas State versus Oklahoma in 2000 and 2003, Colorado versus Oklahoma in 2004, Nebraska versus Oklahoma on December 2, 2006, and Missouri versus Oklahoma in 2008.

From 2007 to 2011, Arrowhead Stadium hosted the Border Showdown between the Kansas Jayhawks and the Missouri Tigers. The 2007 game between the #2 Jayhawks and #3 Tigers, drew the second largest crowd in stadium history, at 80,537, with the Tigers winning 36-28. Kansas also played Oklahoma at Arrowhead in 2005. Missouri played Arkansas State in 2005, BYU in 2015. Missouri was scheduled to play Arkansas in 2020, however, the game location was changed due to the COVID-19 pandemic.

In 2009 and 2010, Arrowhead Stadium hosted football games between the Iowa State Cyclones and the Kansas State Wildcats. Iowa State previously played at Arrowhead against the Florida State Seminoles in the 2002 Eddie Robinson Classic.  Kansas State played Cal in the 2003 Eddie Robinson Classic.

In 1998, Oklahoma State moved its scheduled home game vs. Nebraska to Arrowhead.

The stadium also played host to the annual Fall Classic at Arrowhead, a Division II game that featured Northwest Missouri State University and Pittsburg State University. The 2004 game featured No. 1 Pittsburg State defeating No. 2 Northwest Missouri State in the only Division II game to feature the nation's top two teams playing in the regular season finale.

Soccer

With the formation of Major League Soccer in 1996, Arrowhead Stadium became home to the Kansas City Wiz. After the 1996 season, the team was renamed the Wizards. They left after the 2007 season, after being sold by the Hunt Family to On Goal, LLC, once their lease ended. This was also beneficial so that construction work on Arrowhead Stadium's renovation could take place during the NFL off-season. The Wizards moved to CommunityAmerica Ballpark in 2008 and did not return to Arrowhead except for one friendly.

That friendly was played on July 25, 2010, the Kansas City Wizards faced Manchester United at Arrowhead Stadium for the English team's third preseason friendly in America during 2011. Due to ticket demand, they could not play the game at their new home stadium, CommunityAmerica Ballpark. The match ended with Kansas City winning 2-1 with Dimitar Berbatov scoring the only goal for Manchester United on a penalty kick.

The stadium has hosted one US Men's National Team match and three Women's National Team matches.

2026 FIFA World Cup
Arrowhead Stadium was chosen as one of the 16 venues that will host games during the 2026 FIFA World Cup, which will be hosted jointly by the United States, Canada and Mexico. The stadium will require renovations. Kansas City, Missouri mayor Quinton Lucas estimated the cost of the necessary renovations at $50 million.

Renovations

On April 4, 2006, Jackson County voters approved a tax increase to finance municipal bonds to pay for $850 million in renovations to Arrowhead Stadium and nearby Kauffman Stadium. Before the bond election, the NFL awarded the 49th Super Bowl in 2015 to Kansas City provided it would have a climate-controlled stadium. With the passing of the stadium bill, the Chiefs signed a new lease which ensures that the team will remain at Arrowhead until at least 2031.

However, a second bond issue to build the rolling roof shared with Kauffman Stadium that was part of the original 1967 stadium plan was defeated by voters, and Kansas City chose to withdraw its request to host Super Bowl XLIX in 2015; the game was played at the University of Phoenix Stadium (now State Farm Stadium) in Glendale, Arizona.

On August 15, 2007, the Chiefs announced final plans for the renovated Arrowhead Stadium, which would cost $375 million. The cost to the city was reduced by $50 million thanks to an additional payment by the Hunt family, which originally had intended to donate $75 million. The renovated stadium features the Chiefs Hall of Honor, a tribute to Lamar Hunt, and "horizon level" seating in which luxury suite owners sit outdoors.

Reconstruction for the stadiums started on October 3, 2007. Refurbishment of nearby Kauffman Stadium, home to the Kansas City Royals baseball team, commenced at that time, and both completely-refurbished stadiums were ready for play by the 2010 season.

In 2019, the Chiefs announced multiple renovations for the 2020 season, which included replaced seats in the lower level, a new video display on the East end, and locker room upgrades.

Stadium music
From 1963 to 2008, the TD Pack Band was a mainstay at every Chiefs home game. The band was founded by trumpeter Tony DiPardo. The band was previously known as The Zing Band while the Chiefs played at Municipal Stadium. DiPardo, nicknamed "Mr. Music", was born in St. Louis, Missouri on August 15, 1912. DiPardo has written songs about the team such as "The Chiefs are on the Warpath" and "The Hank Stram Polka". DiPardo received a Super Bowl ring for the Chiefs' victory in Super Bowl IV.

References

External links

 
 Arrowhead Stadium at StadiumDB.com
 Arrowhead stadium info on KCChiefs.com – Seating chart – Virtual Tour
 Stadiums of Pro Football: Arrowhead stadium
 Arrowhead Stadium Seating Chart

American football venues in Missouri
Big 12 Championship Game venues
National Football League venues
Former Major League Soccer stadiums
Soccer venues in Missouri
Sports venues in Kansas City, Missouri
Kansas City Chiefs stadiums
Sporting Kansas City
Sports venues completed in 1972
1972 establishments in Missouri
2026 FIFA World Cup Stadiums